Lee Cameron McIntyre is a research fellow at the Center for Philosophy and History of Science at Boston University and an Instructor in Ethics at Harvard Extension School. He has published books and articles on the philosophy of the social sciences, as well as attempts to undermine science and the appropriate response to these attempts to scientists.

Early life and education 
McIntyre earned a B.A. in philosophy of social science from Wesleyan University and an M.A. and Ph.D. in philosophy from the University of Michigan. McIntyre's doctoral dissertation was on the status of law-like explanations in the social sciences.

Career 

McIntyre taught philosophy at Colgate University, Boston University, Tufts Experimental College, and Simmons College.

In addition, he taught at the Harvard Extension School, was Executive Director of the Institute for Quantitative Social Science at Harvard University, and served as a policy advisor to the Executive Dean of the Faculty of Arts and Sciences at Harvard.

McIntyre was an Associate Editor in the Research Department of the Federal Reserve Bank of Boston.

Body of work 

McIntyre's books have been concerned with the nature of scientific knowledge generation and validation. These have included Explaining explanation, essays in the philosophy of the special sciences, Laws and explanation in the social sciences, Dark ages: the case for a science of human behavior, and Respecting truth: willful ignorance in the internet age.

In his 2018 book Post-Truth, he explores the environment and "atmosphere" surrounding the concept of post-truth. Carlos Lozada, reviewer for the Washington Post, stated of Post-Truth that McIntyre "convincingly tracks how intelligent-design proponents and later climate deniers drew from postmodernism to undermine public perceptions of evolution and climate change."

In his 2019 book, The Scientific Attitude: defending science from denial, fraud, and pseudoscience, McIntyre describes scientific thinking, and therefore the demarcation problem, as a willingness to revise an opinion after discovering new evidence. A scientific attitude refers a willingness to collect, and be open and skeptical about data collected, which distinguishes science from pseudoscience, scientific denialism and conspiracy theories. Publishers Weekly said that the book "articulates why the pursuit of scientific truths, even if inevitably flawed and subject to human error, matters." Harriet Hall reviewed the book for Skeptical Inquirer Magazine and writes that MacIntyre tries to explain science by explaining what it is not. He states that what the difference between what science is and it isn't is the "scientific attitude".

Essays and articles 
McIntyre is the author of numerous philosophical essays that have appeared in Synthese, Philosophy of the Social Sciences, Teaching Philosophy, Perspectives on Science, Biology and Philosophy, Critica, and Theory and Decision, as well as articles that have appeared in The New York Times, The Times Higher Education Supplement, The Humanist, The Chronicle of Higher Education, and Regional Review. The assault on science was published in the Scientific American blog in 2019. The New Statesman published his article: Why Donald Trump and Vladimir Putin lie... and why they are so good at it.

McIntyre's article Flat Earthers and the Rise of Science Denial in America  was reprinted as the cover story for the July 14, 2019, print edition of Newsweek.

Books edited 
MacIntyre is the co-editor of three anthologies: Readings in the Philosophy of Social Science, Philosophy of Chemistry, and Philosophy of Chemistry, 2nd edition.

Presentations 
Michael Shermer invited McIntyre to present on his program Science Salon # 77: The scientific attitude: defending science from denial, fraud, and pseudoscience. On March 17–20, 2021, McIntyre presented at the first Global Congress on Scientific Thinking and Action; in a presentation entitled Science Denialism, he discussed his conversations with flat earth believers, which would become the basis of his forthcoming book, How to Talk to a Science Denier. He stressed the importance of face-to-face conversations and gaining the trust of the people you are trying to convince.

Awards and recognition 
Post-Truth was named book of the week by Fareed Zakaria of CNN.

Other works 
McIntyre also writes suspense fiction. The Sin Eater is a thriller  by McIntyre published in 2019.

Bibliography

References

External links 

 Lee C. McIntyre homepage
 Climate Science in an Age of Misinformation. (YouTube Video) Lecture at University of Rhode Island
 The Price Of Denialism. in New York Times
 The attack on truth. in The Chronicle of Higher Education
 Truth in an Era of Fake News - Harvard Humanist Club
 Why Donald Trump and Vladimir Putin lie... and why they are so good at it
 "The Roots of the Post-Truth Era," The Brian Lehrer Show (NPR)/ "The Roots of the Post-Truth Era," The Brian Lehrer Show (NPR)
 "Fake News Feels Good," The Colin McEnroe Show (NPR)

Boston University faculty
Philosophers of science
20th-century American philosophers
University of Michigan alumni
Wesleyan University alumni
Living people
Philosophers of social science
Catlin Gabel School alumni
Year of birth missing (living people)
Harvard Extension School faculty